Gymnobathra hamatella is a moth of the family Oecophoridae. It was described by Francis Walker in 1864. It is found in New Zealand.

References

 Gymnobathra hamatella in Species-ID

Moths described in 1864
Oecophoridae